The 1984 European Wrestling Championships  was held from 26 to 30 April 1984 in Jönköping, Sweden.

Medal table

Medal summary

Men's freestyle

Men's Greco-Roman

References

External links
Fila's official championship website

Europe
W
European Wrestling Championships
Euro
Sports competitions in Jönköping
1984 in European sport